Daeshon Hall (born June 14, 1995) is an American football defensive end who is a free agent. He played college football at Texas A&M.

High school career
Hall attended Garfield High School in Seattle, Washington and Lancaster High School in Lancaster, Texas. As a senior he had 83 tackles and 23 sacks.

College career
Hall played at the Texas A&M University from 2013 to 2016. During his career, he had 158 tackles and 14 sacks.

Professional career

Carolina Panthers
Hall was drafted by the Carolina Panthers in the third round, 77th overall, in the 2017 NFL Draft. He was placed on injured reserve on October 6, 2017.

On September 1, 2018, Hall was waived by the Panthers.

San Francisco 49ers
On September 6, 2018, Hall was signed to the San Francisco 49ers' practice squad.

Houston Texans
On September 25, 2018, Hall was signed by the Houston Texans off the 49ers' practice squad. He was waived on October 20, 2018 and re-signed to the practice squad.

Philadelphia Eagles
On December 11, 2018, Hall was signed by the Philadelphia Eagles off the Texans practice squad.

In Week 17 of the 2019 season, Hall suffered a torn ACL on the final play of the game, and was placed on injured reserve on December 31, 2019. He was waived with a failed physical designation on July 26, 2020, and subsequently reverted to the team's reserve/physically unable to perform list after clearing waivers the next day. He was waived from the PUP list on October 23.

New York Jets
On October 26, 2020, Hall was claimed off waivers by the New York Jets, but was waived four days later after failing his physical.

San Francisco 49ers (second stint)
On December 16, 2020, Hall was signed to the San Francisco 49ers practice squad. He signed a reserve/future contract on January 4, 2021. He was released on July 26, 2021.

Miami Dolphins
On February 18, 2022, Hall signed with the Miami Dolphins. He was released on June 8, 2022.

References

External links
Texas A&M Aggies bio

1995 births
Living people
Players of American football from Seattle
American football defensive ends
Texas A&M Aggies football players
Carolina Panthers players
San Francisco 49ers players
Houston Texans players
Philadelphia Eagles players
New York Jets players
Miami Dolphins players